Alice's Birthday (translit. Den' rozhdeniya Alisy), is a 2009 Russian traditionally animated children's science fiction film, directed by Sergey Seryogin and produced by Master-film studio. The film is based on a novella of the same name by Kir Bulychov about Alisa (Alice) Selezneva, a teenage girl from the future. It is a spiritual successor to 1981 animated film The Mystery of the Third Planet, from which it draws a heavy influence.

Plot
Alisa Selezneva joins an archeological expedition to the dead planet of Coleida. There are well-preserved cities from the past, yet all of planet's inhabitants had died centuries ago due to unknown plague.

Using a time-travelling device, Alisa and an alien scientist Rrrr, who looks almost exactly like a cat, travel to the planet's past, to the day the plague began. They find themselves in a world that resembles 20th century Earth, Soviet Union in particular. Coleidians are expecting the return of their cosmonauts from their first trip to another planet. Alisa realizes that the cosmonauts were the cause of the plague, and decides to prevent it.

Through numerous obstacles, she comes close to the returned spaceship and uses a disinfection spray to prevent plague from spreading. To Coleidian police, it looks like an assault, so they catch Alisa and imprison her. With Rrrr's help, she's able to escape and return to the future. Upon arrival, they find that the future changed and Coleida is no more a dead planet, but a flourishing civilisation.

Cast
Yasya Nikolaeva as Alisa Selezneva
Alexey Kolgan as Gromozeka / magician
Yevgeny Stychkin as Rrrr, Professor
Natalya Murashkevich as captain of the spaceship
Roman Staburov as Stepan / Doctor Tuk
Mark Cernavin as Bolo
Nikolay Lazarev as Seleznev, professor, father of Alisa
Alexey Kuznetsov as Shepherd / Speaker
Elena Gabets as Grandma Tolo
Anatoly Vologdin as speaking diary / railwaymen / policemen
Anna Glazkova as teacher / mom Bolo
George Muradyan as twins
Sergey Gabrielyan is a kiosk
Victoria Radunskaya as the old lady in the window
Dmitry Kurt as cat catchers / railwaymen / policemen
Anatoly Vologdin, Mikhail Lebedev as railroad / police officers

Production
Roughly one third of the film's 60 million ruble budget was provided by the Russian government.

The film premiered in Star City, Russia on February 12, 2009. It was widely released in Russia on February 19 with 250 film prints.

Some of the scenes were done using Flash animation. The part of Gromozeka was played by Aleksey Kolgan, who is also the Russian voice of Shrek. Natalya Guseva, who played Alisa in the 1985 live-action TV series Guest from the Future, has a minor role as the spaceship captain.

Script Editor - Natalya Abramova. Art Director — Sergey Gavrilov.

Reception
Alice's Birthday was met with mixed reviews. It was praised as a faithful adaptation and for following the traditions of The Mystery of the Third Planet, as Alice's Birthday characters' design was largely based on that film. Yet many critics were disappointed with the film's visual style and soundtrack. Mir Fantastiki called the film a nostalgic reprise of Soviet science fiction that tries to catch up to modern children.

See also
 The Mystery of the Third Planet
 Russian films of 2009
 History of Russian animation
 List of animated feature films

References

External links
  
 
 Alice's Birthday at MASTER-FILM
 Russian version
 Interview with director and producer (translated to English)
 Artwork for the film 
  A number of demo-reels and trailers

2009 films
2009 animated films
Space adventure films
Russian and Soviet animated science fiction films
Films set in the 22nd century
Films based on works by Kir Bulychov